Belair Development is an historic site in Prince George's County, Maryland.

It consists of 7 planned communities: Meadowbrook, Tulip Grove, Kenilworth, Somerset, Buckingham, Heather Hills and Foxhill built by Levitt & Sons in what is now Bowie, Maryland, constructed between 1957 and 1965.

When constructed, Levitt refused to sell homes in the development to blacks while advocating that the United States government take steps to end racial discrimination in housing.

The development takes its name from the Belair Mansion.

References

External links
The Unofficial Reference for Levitt and Sons communities worldwide

Bowie, Maryland
Historic sites in Maryland